Catherine Helen Fogarty (born 28 May 1971) is a Zimbabwean former freestyle swimmer. She competed in three events at the 1988 Summer Olympics.

References

External links
 

1971 births
Living people
Zimbabwean female freestyle swimmers
Olympic swimmers of Zimbabwe
Swimmers at the 1988 Summer Olympics
Place of birth missing (living people)